The Metro G Line, previously known as the Robert Street Corridor, is a proposed bus rapid transit corridor, from Little Canada to West Saint Paul via downtown Saint Paul on Rice and Robert Streets. Robert Street is named after Captain Louis Robert, an early resident of Saint Paul. The corridor's population is expected to grow 45% and 27% more jobs are expected to come to the area from 2000 to 2030. In the 2006 state bonding bill, $500,000 was set aside to study the feasibility of adding mass transit. Robert Street, the south portion of the corridor, was also studied for light rail improvements. In the Metropolitan Council's 2030 Transportation Policy Plan Robert Street is one of nine arterial streets that are recommended for bus rapid transit. Six of the nine corridors would be built by 2020 and the remaining three would be built by 2030. In February 2021, the corridor was selected to be implemented as the G Line.

See also
Metro A Line
Metro C Line
Robert Street (Metro Transit station)
Robert Street Bridge

References

External links
 Robert Street Transitway Overview
 

Bus rapid transit in Minnesota
Transportation in Saint Paul, Minnesota
Proposed public transportation in Minnesota
Transportation in Ramsey County, Minnesota
Transportation in Dakota County, Minnesota
Metro Transit (Minnesota)